Josh Sims may refer to:
 Josh Sims (lacrosse)
 Josh Sims (footballer)